Zhangixalus duboisi is a species of frog in the family Rhacophoridae found in China and Vietnam. Its natural habitats are subtropical or tropical moist montane forests, freshwater marshes, intermittent freshwater marshes, and heavily degraded former forests. It is threatened by habitat loss.

References

duboisi
Taxonomy articles created by Polbot
Amphibians described in 2000